Soleuvre is a town in the commune of Sanem, in the canton of Esch-sur-Alzette in south-western Luxembourg.  , the town has a population of 5,471. In 2001, Soleuvre was the fourteenth-largest town in Luxembourg, and the largest that is not the most populous in its own commune (Sanem's administrative centre, Belvaux, is larger).

See also
Zolwerknapp

Sanem
Towns in Luxembourg